Fitzloyd 'Fitz' Dean Walker (born 7 March 1959) is a male Jamaican born retired wrestler and judoka, who competed for Great Britain and England.

Wrestling career
Walker competed at the 1980 Summer Olympics, the 1984 Summer Olympics and the 1988 Summer Olympics. He represented Jamaica in the 68kg lightweight division, at the 1978 Commonwealth Games in Edmonton, Alberta, Canada. Four years later he represented his new nation England in the 74kg welterweight division and finished in sixth place, at the 1982 Commonwealth Games in Brisbane, Queensland, Australia. He represented England and won a bronze medal in the 74kg welterweight division, at the 1986 Commonwealth Games in Edinburgh, Scotland.

Judo career
He became a champion of Great Britain, winning the lightweight division at the British Judo Championships in 1982.

References

External links
 

1959 births
Living people
British male sport wrestlers
Olympic wrestlers of Great Britain
Wrestlers at the 1980 Summer Olympics
Wrestlers at the 1984 Summer Olympics
Wrestlers at the 1988 Summer Olympics
Wrestlers at the 1982 Commonwealth Games
Wrestlers at the 1986 Commonwealth Games
Commonwealth Games medallists in wrestling
Commonwealth Games bronze medallists for England
English male judoka
British male judoka
Medallists at the 1986 Commonwealth Games